In mathematics, a split exact sequence is a short exact sequence in which the middle term is built out of the two outer terms in the simplest possible way.

Equivalent characterizations

A short exact sequence of abelian groups or of modules over a fixed ring, or more generally of objects in an abelian category

is called split exact if it is isomorphic to the exact sequence where the middle term is the direct sum of the outer ones:

The requirement that the sequence is isomorphic means that there is an isomorphism  such that the composite  is the natural inclusion  and such that the composite  equals b. This can be summarized by a commutative diagram as:

The splitting lemma provides further equivalent characterizations of split exact sequences.

Examples
A trivial example of a split short exact sequence is 

 
Any short exact sequence of vector spaces is split exact. This is a rephrasing of the fact that any set of linearly independent vectors in a vector space can be extended to a basis.

The exact sequence  (where the first map is multiplication by 2) is not split exact.

Related notions

Pure exact sequences can be characterized as the filtered colimits of split exact sequences.

References

Sources

Abstract algebra